Laura Bernat (born 28 September 2005) is a Polish swimmer. She competed in the women's 50 metre backstroke event at the 2020 European Aquatics Championships, in Budapest, Hungary. She won gold at the 200 metre backstroke event in the 2021 European Junior Swimming Championships with a time of 2:10.14.

References

External links
 

2005 births
Living people
Polish female backstroke swimmers
Place of birth missing (living people)
Swimmers at the 2020 Summer Olympics
Olympic swimmers of Poland
21st-century Polish women